Peter Komanda is a retired Soviet and Ukrainian football player.

Career
Peter Komanda started his career in 1985 with Desna Chernihiv, where he played 5 matches, then in 1992 he moved to Cheksyl Chernihiv, another team in the city of Chernihiv. In 1992 he moved to Cheksyl Chernihiv, where he won the Chernihiv Oblast Football Championship and the Chernihiv Oblast Football Cup in 1992. Then he returned to Desna Chernihiv and in 1993 he moved to Cheksyl Chernihiv for one season where he played 12 matches. In 1994 he returned to Desna Chernihiv for two season where he played 65 and scored 1 goal.

Honours
Khimik Chernihiv
 Chernihiv Oblast Football Championship: 1992
 Chernihiv Oblast Football Cup: 1992

References

External links 
 Peter Komanda footballfacts.ru

1968 births
Living people
Footballers from Chernihiv
Soviet footballers
FC Desna Chernihiv players
FC Cheksyl Chernihiv players
Ukrainian footballers
Ukrainian Second League players
Association football midfielders